De'Aundre Bonds is an American actor.

Career
Bonds has mostly appeared as a guest actor on television shows; however, he was also featured in the Spike Lee film Get on the Bus, in Tales from the Hood and in the Rick Famuyiwa film The Wood. Between 2019 - 2022 he had a recurring role on the series “Snowfall” as Scully. He has a production company called Take Off Productions with fellow actor Francis Capra.

Personal life
Bonds was born in Los Angeles, California. In 2001, he was convicted of manslaughter in the death of his aunt's boyfriend, and in 2011, he finished serving a 10-year sentence at California Rehabilitation Center Norco, California.

Filmography

Film

Television

References

External links

Living people
American male film actors
Male actors from Los Angeles
American people convicted of manslaughter
African-American male actors
American male television actors
21st-century African-American people
20th-century African-American people
Year of birth missing (living people)